Lincoln Park Public Schools is a school district with its headquarters in Lincoln Park, Michigan, United States.

Schools

Secondary schools
 Lincoln Park High School #2
 Lincoln Park Middle School

elementary school    
Carr Elementary School
Foote Elementary School
Hoover Elementary School
Keppen Elementary School 
Lafayette Elementary School
Paun Elementary School
Raupp Elementary School

Defunct schools
Crowley Elementary School - Last used as the Crowley Center.
Goodell Grade School - This school building was extant from 1918 until 1976 when it was razed. The original one-room wooden school house on the site served students of District 11 of Ecorse Township.
Hamilton Elementary School
Horger Elementary School - This school has been razed.
Huff Middle School (formerly Lincoln Park High School #1) - Razed and replaced by Lincoln Park Middle School.
Lafayette Elementary School #1 - Razed and replaced by Lafayette Elementary School #2.
LeBlanc Elementary School - Last used for special education purposes, now home to Blessed Hope Christian Church
Mixter Elementary School - Now houses the Mixter Institute or Transition (and thrift store). Students 18–26 with Autism Spectrum Disorder.
Raupp Elementary School #1 - Razed and replaced with Raupp Elementary School #2
Smith Elementary School - Now houses administrative offices for the school district.
Strowig Grade School - This school was razed in 1926 with the widening of Fort Street. The original one-room wooden school house on the site served students of District 5 of Ecorse Township.

References

External links

 Lincoln Park Public Schools

School districts in Michigan
Education in Wayne County, Michigan